Godfrey Charles Morgan, 1st Viscount Tredegar (28 April 1831 – 11 March 1913) was a Welsh officer, a General in the British Army, and a peer in the House of Lords.  Tredegar was born on 28 April 1831 in Ruperra Castle, Glamorganshire, the eldest son of Charles Morgan, 1st Baron Tredegar and his wife Rosamund Morgan (née Mundy), Baroness Tredegar. He was educated at Eton and joined the British Army in 1853.

When the Crimean War broke out in 1854, Tredegar, aged 22, held the rank of captain in the 17th Lancers and accompanied his famous regiment to the scene of the great struggle. He was in action at the Battle of Alma and later on 25 October 1854 was in command of a section of the Light Brigade that rode into the 'Valley of Death' at the Battle of Balaclava, which he survived. Godfrey's horse, 'Sir Briggs', also survived, and lived at Tredegar's home, Tredegar House, Newport, Wales, until his death at the age of 28. He was buried in the Cedar Garden at Tredegar House (though not with full military honours as is frequently believed). The monument still stands there today.

In later years, as other members of the Morgan family had been in the past, he became a benefactor to the people of Newport. Large tracts of land were donated to the Newport Corporation for the benefit of the public, including Belle Vue Park, the Royal Gwent Hospital and Newport Athletics Grounds.  This earned him the nickname of "Godfrey the Good" among local people. He served as High Sheriff of Monmouthshire for 1858. Tredegar succeeded his father as 2nd Baron Tredegar in 1875.

In May 1902 he bought the lordships of the manor of Newport and Caerleon from the Duke of Beaufort, including the right to appoint a member of the Newport Harbour Commission.

He was created Viscount Tredegar, of Tredegar in the County of Monmouth on 28 December 1905, and became the first Freeman of Newport in 1909.

He was awarded the Freedom of the City of Cardiff on 25 October 1909.

Tredegar died on 11 March 1913 aged 81 and is buried at Bassaleg Parish Church. He never married and on his death the viscountcy became extinct and his barony and baronetcy and the Tredegar estate passed to his nephew Courtenay Morgan, who spent little time in Wales.

A statue of The Viscount Tredegar was unveiled in 1909 in Gorsedd Gardens, Cathays Park, Cardiff. The sculptor was Sir William Goscombe John.

References

External links
 
 
 

1831 births
1913 deaths
People educated at Eton College
People from Caerphilly
Lord-Lieutenants of Monmouthshire
Viscounts in the Peerage of the United Kingdom
17th Lancers officers
British Army personnel of the Crimean War
Morgan, Godfrey
Morgan, Godfrey
Morgan, Godfrey
Morgan, Godfrey
Morgan, Godfrey
Morgan, Godfrey
UK MPs who inherited peerages
UK MPs who were granted peerages
History of Newport, Wales
High Sheriffs of Monmouthshire
Eldest sons of British hereditary barons
Welsh army officers
Peers created by Edward VII